Dancing Girls may refer to:

Dancing Girls (book), 1977 collection of short stories by Margaret Atwood
Dancing Girls (song), 1984 single by Nik Kershaw
Dancing Girls (1896 film), British silent short film
Make It Happen (film), 2008 American film, known in France as Dancing Girls

See also
Dancing Girl (disambiguation)
Women in dance